was a  located 
in Owase, Mie Prefecture, Japan. It was built by Naka Sinhachirō.

History 
The castle was built around the Sengoku period, but was attacked by Horinouchi Ujiyoshi and it fell in 1582. Whatever few remains survive of this era are maintained as a park now.

See also

 Japanese castle

Castles in Mie Prefecture